Ter Hage Abbey, was a Roman Catholic convent for females of the Cistercian Order in Axel, Netherlands, in operation from 1269 until 1572.

History
The Abbey was first mentioned in 1269, when it was temporarily relocated from Axel to a farm owned by the abbey near Merelbeke, but it was moved back in 1273. During the 16th-century, the abbey played an important political role under its abbess Amalberga Vos: it was a center of religion and charity, and was in 1544 given status as a refuge for religious dissidents, housing many important people during a time of religious persecution.
During the great Iconoclasm of 1566, the Calvinist Caspar van der Heyden held a speech outside the convent gates the 24 August, after which the abbey was attacked: the nuns were given safe passage, but the abbey was pillaged. In 1572, the abbess relocated the nuns to Gent, and the abbey was de facto no longer active in Axel: there were plans to return in the 1570s, but nothing came of it. The same abbey were restored in Gent as "New Ter Hage Abbey", where it was located (except for 1578-84) until it was dissolved in 1794.

References

13th-century establishments in Europe
Christian monasteries established in the 13th century
1572 disestablishments
Cistercian nunneries in the Netherlands
Monasteries dissolved under the Dutch Reformation